St Albans is a constituency represented in the House of Commons of the UK Parliament since 2019 by Daisy Cooper, a Liberal Democrat.

This article also describes the parliamentary borough (1554-1852) of the same name, consisting only of the city of St Albans, which elected two MPs by the bloc vote system.

History 
The Parliamentary Borough of St Albans was represented by two MPs for over 300 years, until it was disenfranchised as a result of electoral corruption in 1852.

The constituency was re-established in an enlarged form by the Redistribution of Seats Act 1885 (which followed on from the Third Reform Act) as one of four Divisions of the abolished three-member Parliamentary County of Hertfordshire, and was formally named as the Mid or St Albans Division of Hertfordshire.

1885 to date 

 Political history before 1997

Until 1997 the seat was held by one Conservative or another save for the very early 20th century Official Opposition leadership of Henry Campbell-Bannerman and the follow-on first part of his premiership, governing in minority, and later – from 1945 – five of the six years seeing Labour's landslide Attlee ministry.

 Political history since 1997
The seat swung towards the left wing on boundary changes effective in 1997, and the founding of the New Labour movement which sought public sector reform and investment with expansion based on international investor-friendly economic growth.  The seat followed its projections in line with the large swing led by Tony Blair, to sees its return to a Labour politician. Results, except for a strong Tory surge in 2015 are closer than the 1979–1992 Tory victories forming a complex three-party contest – only once another candidate in this time has reached the deposit (politics)-retaining threshold of 5% of the vote, UKIP at its 2015 peak.

Despite the former Labour MP for the seat, Kerry Pollard, standing there in 2005, 2015 and 2017, he fell varyingly short. The 2019 vote share fell to below that seen in the 1980s, locally, for the party's candidate – the party leader was to the left of the party, Jeremy Corbyn.

The seat has had great fluctuation in Liberal Democrat vote share: 2001 and 2015 were ebbs at below 20% of the vote; in 2010 and 2017 the Liberal Democrat candidate, promisingly, took 4.4% and 10.7% less than the winning Conservative. Liberal Democrat Daisy Cooper went on to win, in 2019. She became first member of a liberal party to represent the constituency since John Bamford Slack in early 1900s.

Prominent members
The noble and local landowning Grimston family have produced nine members throughout the seat's history.  The three first heirs to the Earldom of Verulam have won election in the seat - the latest MP from the family was John Grimston who later became the 6th Earl (died 1973).

Sir Hildred Carlile (died 1942) was a textiles entrepreneur and generous benefactor of Bedford College, University of London.

Francis Fremantle was chairman of the Parliamentary Medical Committee from 1923 to 1943.

Peter Lilley was a frontbench minister in government from 1992 until 1997, the Secretary of State for Social Security, after two years as Secretary of State for Trade and Industry.

Constituency profile 
Workless claimants (registered jobseekers) were in November 2012 significantly lower than the national average of 3.8%, at 1.9% of the population based on a statistical compilation by The Guardian. The seat voted decisively to remain in the European Union in the 2016 Referendum, estimated at 62.2%.

Boundary changes 

1885–1918: The Municipal Borough of St Albans, the Sessional Divisions of Barnet and St Albans and parts of the Sessional Divisions of Watford, Hertford and Dacorum.

As well from the Borough of St Albans, the seat included the towns of Harpenden, Hatfield and Chipping Barnet.

1918–1945: The Municipal Borough of St Albans, the Urban Districts of Barnet and East Barnet Valley, the Rural Districts of Barnet and Hatfield, and the Rural District of St Albans civil parishes of Sandridge Rural, St Michael Rural, St Peter Rural, and St Stephen.

North-western parts, including Harpenden, transferred to the new Hemel Hempstead Division. South-western corner (Aldenham) transferred to Watford.

1945–1950: The Municipal Borough of St Albans, the Urban District of Welwyn Garden City, the Rural District of Hatfield, and the Rural District of St Albans civil parishes of Sandridge Rural, St Michael Rural, St Peter Rural, and St Stephen.

The Urban Districts of Barnet and East Barnet (formerly East Barnet Valley) and the Rural District of Elstree (formerly Barnet) formed the new Barnet Division. The Urban District of Welwyn Garden City had been formed as a separate local authority which had previously been partly in the Hitchin Division.  Other marginal changes as a result of changes to local authority boundaries.

1950–1955: The Municipal Borough of St Albans, the Urban District of Welwyn Garden City, the Rural District of Welwyn, and the Rural District of St Albans civil parishes of Sandridge Rural, St Michael Rural, St Peter Rural, St Stephen, and Wheathampstead.

The Rural District of Welwyn was transferred from Hitchin and the parish of Wheathampstead from Hemel Hempstead.  The Rural District of Hatfield was transferred to Barnet.

1955–1974: The Municipal Borough of St Albans, and in the Rural District of St Albans the civil parishes of Colney Heath, London Colney, Sandridge Rural, St Michael Rural, St Stephen, and Wheathampstead.

The Urban District of Welwyn Garden City and the Rural District of Welwyn transferred to Hertford.  (The parish of St Peter Rural had been divided into the parishes of Colney Heath and London Colney).

1974–1983: The Municipal Borough of St Albans, the Urban District of Harpenden, and in the Rural District of St Albans the civil parishes of Harpenden Rural, Redbourn, St Michael Rural, Sandridge, and Wheathampstead.

The limits moved northwards: to take in Harpenden U.D. and parishes Harpenden Rural and Redbourn, from Hemel Hempstead.  The parishes of Colney Heath, London Colney and St Stephen were removed to help constitute South Hertfordshire.

1983–1997: The District of St Albans wards of Ashley, Batchwood, Clarence, Colney Heath, Cunningham, Harpenden East, Harpenden North, Harpenden South, Harpenden West, Marshalswick North, Marshalswick South, Redbourn, St Peter's, Sandridge, Sopwell, and Verulam.

Minor changes.  Colney Heath transferred from abolished South Hertfordshire.  Wheathampstead transferred to Welwyn Hatfield.

1997–2010: The District of St Albans wards of Ashley, Batchwood, Clarence, Colney Heath, Cunningham, London Colney, Marshalswick North, Marshalswick South, Park Street, St Peter's, St Stephen's, Sopwell, and Verulam, and the District of Three Rivers ward of Bedmond.

Moved southwards again, gaining London Colney from Hertsmere, Park Street and St Stephen's from Watford and the Three Rivers District ward of Bedmond from South West Hertfordshire.  Northern parts, including Harpenden, formed part of the new County Constituency of Hitchin and Harpenden.

2010–present: The City of St Albans wards of Ashley, Batchwood, Clarence, Colney Heath, Cunningham, London Colney, Marshalswick North, Marshalswick South, Park Street, St Peter's, St Stephen, Sopwell, and Verulam, and the Three Rivers District ward of Bedmond and Primrose Hill.

Marginal adjustments to bring the parliamentary boundaries in line with those of local government wards, which had changed since the 1995 review.

The seat is in Hertfordshire, England.  Specifically, it comprises the cathedral city of St Albans and some of the surrounding countryside, mainly to the south of the city.

Neighbouring seats, clockwise from north, are: Hitchin and Harpenden, Welwyn Hatfield, Hertsmere, Watford, and Hemel Hempstead.

Members of Parliament

MPs 1553–1640

MPs 1640–1852

MPs since 1885

Election results

Elections in the 2010s 

This constituency underwent boundary changes between the 2005 and 2010 general elections and thus calculation of change in vote share is not meaningful

Elections in the 2000s

Elections in the 1990s

This constituency underwent boundary changes between the 1992 and 1997 general elections and thus calculation of change in vote share is not meaningful

Elections in the 1980s 

This constituency underwent boundary changes between the 1979 and 1983 general elections and thus calculation of change in vote share is not meaningful

Elections in the 1970s 

This constituency underwent boundary changes between the 1970 and February 1974 general elections and thus calculation of change in vote share is not meaningful.

Elections in the 1960s

Elections in the 1950s 

This constituency underwent boundary changes between the 1951 and 1955 general elections and thus calculation of change in vote share is not meaningful

This constituency underwent boundary changes between the 1945 and 1950 general elections and thus calculation of change in vote share is not meaningful

Elections in the 1940s 

This constituency underwent boundary changes between the 1935 and 1945 general elections and thus calculation of change in vote share is not meaningful

Elections in the 1930s

Elections in the 1920s

Elections in the 1910s

Elections in the 1900s

Elections in the 1890s

Elections in the 1880s

Elections in the 1850s
On 3 May 1852, the borough was disenfranchised after a Royal Commission found proof of extensive bribery. The electorate was incorporated into Hertfordshire.

 Caused by Raphael's death

Elections in the 1840s

 

 

 Caused by Hare's appointment as a Lord-in-Waiting to Queen Victoria

 

 

 

 Caused by Grimston's resignation by accepting the office of Steward of the Chiltern Hundreds

Elections in the 1830s

See also 
 List of parliamentary constituencies in Hertfordshire

Notes

References

Sources 
Robert Beatson, A Chronological Register of Both Houses of Parliament (London: Longman, Hurst, Res & Orme, 1807) 
D Brunton & D H Pennington, Members of the Long Parliament (London: George Allen & Unwin, 1954)
Cobbett's Parliamentary history of England, from the Norman Conquest in 1066 to the year 1803 (London: Thomas Hansard, 1808) 
F W S Craig, British Parliamentary Election Results 1832-1885 (2nd edition, Aldershot: Parliamentary Research Services, 1989)
Henry Stooks Smith, The Parliaments of England from 1715 to 1847 (2nd edition, edited by FWS Craig - Chichester: Parliamentary Reference Publications, 1973)

External links
2005 voting statistics from the BBC
2001 and 1997 voting statistics from the BBC
OBV
Coverage from The Times

Parliamentary constituencies in Hertfordshire
Constituencies of the Parliament of the United Kingdom established in 1554
1852 disestablishments in the United Kingdom
Constituencies of the Parliament of the United Kingdom established in 1885
Parliamentary constituencies disenfranchised for corruption
Politics of St Albans
Politics of Three Rivers District